A tubaphone is a type of metallophone constructed from a series of metal tubes arranged in a keyboard configuration. The tubes are similar in length to that of a xylophone, and sound vaguely like a glockenspiel.

References

External links 

 An excerpt from Porgy and Bess played on a tubaphone

Keyboard percussion instruments
Idiophones
Pitched percussion instruments